Ilias Bronkhorst (born 10 May 1997) is a Dutch professional footballer who plays for Eredivisie club NEC Nijmegen.

Club career
He made his Eerste Divisie debut for Telstar on 31 August 2018 in a game against Jong FC Utrecht, as a 69th-minute substitute for Melle Springer.

References

External links
 
 Career stats & Profile - Voetbal International

1997 births
Footballers from Haarlem
Living people
Dutch footballers
Association football defenders
SC Telstar players
Koninklijke HFC players
NEC Nijmegen players
Eredivisie players
Eerste Divisie players
Tweede Divisie players
21st-century Dutch people